The Wilkinson River is a short river of the West Coast Region of New Zealand's South Island. It is a tributary of the Whitcombe River.

See also
List of rivers of New Zealand

References

Rivers of the West Coast, New Zealand
Rivers of New Zealand
Westland District